The UCLA Meyer and Renee Luskin School of Public Affairs, commonly known as the UCLA Luskin School of Public Affairs, is the public affairs/public service graduate school at the University of California, Los Angeles.  The school consists of three graduate departments—Public Policy, Social Welfare, and Urban Planning—and an undergraduate program in Public Affairs that began accepting students in 2018. In all, the school offers three undergraduate minors, the undergraduate major, three master's degrees, and two doctoral degrees.

It was formerly known as the School of Public Policy and Social Research until March 18, 2011, when it was renamed after UCLA alumni Meyer and Renee Luskin.

Departments and degrees 
The Luskin School of Public Affairs offers degrees in the following concentrations: 
Public policy – MPP
Social welfare – MSW, PhD
Urban planning – MURP, PhD
Public affairs – BA

Joint degree programs (J.D., MBA., Latin American Studies, Architecture and Urban Design, and Asian American Studies) are offered. Consult individual departments for more information.

The following minors are offered for undergraduate UCLA students:
Public affairs
Urban and Regional Studies
Gerontology

Research centers 
The Luskin School of Public Affairs houses the following research centers:

Luskin Center for Innovation
The Ralph and Goldy Lewis Center for Regional Policy Studies
Institute of Transportation Studies
Center for Policy Research on Aging
Institute on Inequality and Democracy
The Latino Policy & Politics Initiative 
The Center for Neighborhood Knowledge
Latin American Cities Initiative
UCLA Voting Rights Project

Unique programs include a Social Justice Initiative, Senior Fellows program, and Global Public Affairs.

The UCLA Voting Rights Project
The University of California, Los Angeles Voting Rights Project (UCLA VRP) was founded in August 2019. The UCLA VRP is affiliated with the UCLA Latino Politics & Policy Initiative and is housed within the Luskin School of Public Affairs.

The UCLA VRP's Faculty Director is Dr. Matt Barreto, Ph.D., and the project's Director of Litigation is Chad W. Dunn. The purpose of the UCLA VRP is to bring and support voting rights litigation and appeals, provide the Western United States with access to voting rights protections and resources, publish public policy research reports, and teach voting rights centered courses at UCLA for undergraduate, graduate, and law students.

Notable work 
The UCLA VRP is currently involved with the following: Higginson v. Poway, New York v. U.S. Dep't of Commerce, Texas L.U.L.A.C. v. Whitley, Harding v. Dallas County, Texas, and Veasey v. Perry (Abbott).

References

External links 

Educational institutions established in 1994
Luskin School of Public Affairs
Public administration schools in the United States
Public policy schools
1994 establishments in California